Sport Club Corinthians Paulista has a professional beach soccer team based in Brazil.

Mundialito de Clubes 2012 squad

Coach: Alexandre Soares

Honors and titles

Worldwide
Mundialito de Clubes
 Winners: 2013
 Third Place: 2017
 Quarter Final: 2012
 Quarter Final: 2011

National competitions
Campeonato Brasileiro
 Winners: 2012

State competitions
Campeonato Paulista
 Winners: 2017, 2019, 2020

References

Beach
Beach soccer in Brazil